Lifeline, released in Japan as , is a video game released by SCEI and Konami for the PlayStation 2.

Its defining aspect is that the player controls the game entirely by using a microphone to speak commands to on-screen characters. These commands are interpreted by the game via speech recognition. It is generally regarded by game reviewers as average, although its innovation has caused it to become a cult classic among fans.

The game sold well enough to become one of the PS2 The Best, with the lower-priced version released on September 25, 2003, in Japan. Both versions in Japan included the option to purchase the USB headset packaged with the game. The North American release did not offer this bundle.

Plot 
In the near future (year 2029), the player takes the role of a young man who has attended a Christmas party in a newly developed hotel set in a Space Station. As the festivities proceed, problems arise with monsters running rampant across the Space Station. Most of the inhabitants are slaughtered and devoured, with the player character trapped in the Space Station's main control center and separated from his girlfriend, Naomi (Sayaka in the Japanese version). Elsewhere in the monster-infested hotel, the cocktail waitress Rio Hohenheim (voiced by Mariko Suzuki in the Japanese version and Kristen Miller in the English version) has been locked in a detention cell for her own safety during the assault. The player character, referred to as the operator, has access to all Space Station mechanics via the control room and is able to observe everything in the area through cameras. Noticing Rio as she attempts to contact the monitor room, the operator establishes contact through her headset, and assists her through the perils of the station, as well as to discover the mystery behind the threat.

After fighting their way through monsters and getting past difficult puzzles, Rio and the operator learn that the monsters are not aliens as previously thought – they are humans mutated through an attempt to recreate the Philosopher's Stone. This recreation, rather than healing someone, cursed them to stay alive, often mutating them beyond recognition. They also learn that the stone needed to be created in a zero-gravity environment and that the station is on a collision course with the Earth to return the stone for use as a weapon. Along the way, Rio meets with her father, now a disillusioned, disembodied brain in a jar incapable of recognizing her. The operator meets his girlfriend, who is the only mutant to keep their humanity. Both die moments after meeting them. In the end, Rio and the operator destroy the lead monster, and she meets the operator in person. She uses the operator's console to set the space station self-destruct to destroy the stone. As they escape, they are injured by various explosions, but make it to an escape pod without losing their lives. As Rio thanks the operator, the pod starts a descent towards earth.

Gameplay 
Lifeline'''s selling point is its advanced AI system and the ability to direct Rio through the game via the USB headset peripheral. The player is given no direct control over Rio during any course of the game. Instead, the headset's communication aspect is utilized to its fullest, by allowing the player to use scripted commands outlined in the game's various menus. While holding the input mic button (the O button on the DualShock controller), such spoken commands include "hurry", "Stop", "dodge", and "turn left", which cause Rio to perform specific actions and progress throughout the game. Rio can understand up to 500 verbal commands.

The player is given access to various menus which provide inventory insertions, detailed maps, and commands to unlock multiple parts of the station. By using the menus available, the player directs Rio into combat, solving puzzles, and interactions with NPCs. When Rio encounters one of the game's many monsters, combat ensues and the commands are given to direct Rio on which enemy to fire at, which specific body part to fire upon, and when and where to maneuver. Combat perspectives switch between first-person and that of the cameras set about the station, with the latter more suitable for encounters with numerous foes.

Additionally, plot interactions are followed through at the player's general discretion, with Rio inquiring about which path of action to take. In common situations, the player can engage in normal "small talk" and friendly conversation with Rio, with the latter sometimes inquiring about it. However, the voice chat has been commonly attributed as the game's weak point, due to inaccurate actions taken when commands are given, and the basic sense of conversation and directions reduced to simple verbs and nouns, particularly when in the course of solving many of the game's puzzles.  There are also a few "Easter egg" conversations, in which the player can command her to do less than mature things (e.g. to "Bark like a dog"); Rio will also ask about the player's girlfriend's name, and react with surprise if the player gives her own name or the name of Rio's voice actor.

Development

ReceptionLifeline received "mixed" reviews according to video game review aggregator Metacritic.

IGN noted that while the voice recognition system is "quite deep", the player "will need to practice enunciating regular words and learning the speed at which the game best responds", and "might spend five minutes trying to get the right word to simply inspect a worthless book."

In 2008, Game Informer listed Lifeline'' among the worst horror games of all time. In 2009, GamesRadar included it among the games "with untapped franchise potential", commenting: "While this frustrated many PS2 owners, it made others feel more attached to the characters. Improvements in headset and voice-recognition technology make a franchise more viable on today’s systems."

References

External links 

2003 video games
Action-adventure games
Christmas video games
2000s horror video games
Konami games
Microphone-controlled computer games
PlayStation 2-only games
Science fiction video games
Sony Interactive Entertainment games
Video games featuring female protagonists
Video games featuring non-playable protagonists
Video games set in hotels
Video games set in outer space
PlayStation 2 games
Video games developed in Japan
Single-player video games